Elections for the 12th Knesset were held in Israel on 1 November 1988. Voter turnout was 79.7%.

Parliament factions

The table below lists the parliamentary factions represented in the 11th Knesset.

Results

Aftermath

Likud's Yitzhak Shamir formed the twenty-third government on 22 December 1988, including the Alignment, the National Religious Party, Shas, Agudat Yisrael and Degel HaTorah in his coalition, with 25 ministers.

In 1990 Shimon Peres tried to form an Alignment-led coalition in a move that became known as "the dirty trick", but failed to win sufficient support. Eventually Shamir formed the twenty-fourth government on 11 June 1990, with a coalition encompassing Likud, the National Religious Party, Shas, Agudat Yisrael, Degel HaTorah, the New Liberal Party, Tehiya, Tzomet, Moledet, Unity for Peace and Immigration and Geulat Yisrael. Tehiya, Tzomet and Moledet all left the coalition in late 1991/early 1992 in protest at Shamir's participation in the Madrid Conference.

Several defections occurred during the Knesset term; five members of Likud left to form the Party for the Advancement of the Zionist Idea. After two of them returned, the party was renamed the New Liberal Party. Yitzhak Peretz left Shas and established Moria. Eliezer Mizrahi left Agudat Yisrael and established Geulat Yisrael. Efraim Gur left the Alignment to establish Unity for Peace and Immigration, which later merged into Likud.

The Twelfth Knesset saw the rise of the ultra-orthodox religious parties as a significant force in Israeli politics, and as a crucial "swing" element which could determine which of the large two secular parties (Likud, Alignment) would get to form the coalition government. Ratz, Mapam, and Shinui merged into Meretz, while Black Panthers broke away from Hadash.

Notes

References

External links
Historical overview of the Twelfth Knesset Knesset website 
Election results Knesset website	

Israeli legislative
Legislative election
Legislative elections in Israel
November 1988 events in Asia
Israel